Luis Delgado (born 18 February 1991) is a Dominican tennis player.

Delgado has a career-high ITF juniors ranking of 316, achieved on 24 August 2009.

Delgado represented Dominican Republic at the 2007, 2008, 2010, and the 2011 Davis Cup, where he has a W/L record of 1–3.

Davis Cup

Participations: (2–3)

   indicates the outcome of the Davis Cup match followed by the score, date, place of event, the zonal classification and its phase, and the court surface.

References

External links

1991 births
Living people
Dominican Republic male tennis players